Uppingham is a market town in Rutland, England, off the A47 between Leicester and Peterborough,  south of the county town, Oakham. It had a population of 4,745 according to the 2011 census, estimated at 4,853 in 2019.  It is known for its eponymous public school. With its art galleries Uppingham has become a popular destination for art lovers. Uppingham was named "best place to live in the Midlands in 2022" by The Times newspaper, who commented on the town by calling it "a discerning market town with art, heart and smarts — plus the magnificent Rutland Water".

Toponymy 
The name of the town means 'Homestead/village of the Yppingas (upland people)'. It stands on a high ridge near Beaumont Chase, hence "upland".

History

The town has two active churches; The Church of St Peter and St Paul, a largely 14th-century Church of England parish church and the Methodist Church on Orange street, built as a Wesleyan Chapel in 1819 and expanded in the 1870s and 1880s. 

Uppingham Workhouse was first recorded in 1777 with space for 40 inmates. Until 1834 it was a parish workhouse, but in 1836 the Uppingham Poor Law Union began and a Union workhouse was built in Leicester Road to house 158, to a design by architect William Donthorne. In the First World War, the building was used as an auxiliary hospital staffed by a Voluntary Aid Detachment. The workhouse closed in 1929 and the building was taken over by Uppingham School, which uses it as a girls' boarding house called Constables.
 
The Eyebrook Reservoir near Uppingham was used by Avro Lancasters flying from RAF Scampton on the final practice run for Guy Gibson's 617 Squadron Dambusters before Operation Chastise, the attack on the Ruhr valley dams on the night of the 16–17 May 1943.

Market
The weekly market is held on Fridays. The Market Place is transformed once a year in November into the only fatstock show still held in temporary penning in a traditional market town. The first recorded show was in 1889. In 2011, 140 sheep, 24 pigs and 20 cattle were entered. The event attracts farmers from the area to exhibit their prize livestock and then toast their acquaintances in The Falcon Hotel.

Governance
The main local authority is Rutland County Council, which is responsible for most local services. Uppingham ward, which includes the neighbouring parish of Beaumont Chase, has three councillors out of a total of 27 on the county council.

Uppingham Town Council, based at Uppingham Town Hall, is responsible for services such as allotments, cemeteries and open spaces. Its 15 councillors include a Mayor, currently (2022) Councillor Liz Clarke.

Uppingham Rural District was a local government area from 1894 to 1974.

Education
State schooling in Uppingham is covered by a state secondary school, Uppingham Community College, and two primary schools: Leighfield and Uppingham C of E. A proposal to replace the primaries with a newly built school was rejected in 2007.

Uppingham School is an independent school for boarders aged 13 to 18, founded in 1584, charging fees and mainly for boys. Girls have been admitted since 1975.

Art 
Uppingham has several independent and internationally renowned art galleries. The Goldmark Gallery has been selling art from their Uppingham gallery for over 40 years and hold over 50,000 items in stock.

Transport

Rail
 
Uppingham railway station, at the end of a branch line from Seaton, was opened in 1894 and was located at the end of Queen Street. Passenger services were withdrawn in 1960 and the line closed completely in 1964. The station area has now been redeveloped as an industrial estate.  Although the operational railway line runs closest to Uppingham at Manton Junction, it has no station.

Roads
An east-west A47 bypass opened in June 1982, providing a link to Peterborough and Leicester. The A6003 runs through the town and links Uppingham with Oakham, Corby and Kettering.

Buses
Centrebus operates the majority of bus services. The main routes link the town with Oakham, Corby, Leicester (via the 747 Uppingham–Leicester), Peterborough and Stamford.

Sport
Uppingham plays host to a number of different sports; in particular football, where Uppingham Town F.C play their games at Tod's Piece. Uppingham Town Cricket Club's new ground opened in 2011.
Uppingham School's new sports centre was opened by Lord Coe in 2010.

Town Partnership
'Uppingham Town Partnership events' is a not-for-profit community group with the support of the Town Council and Rutland County Council, dedicated to ensuring the town is a great place to live, work and play. Its volunteers organise annual events including "Uppingham Feast Day" (a live music festival with street entertainment, food and drink) held in June and Christmas in Uppingham (a festive celebration with late night shopping in the local shops, visiting market-stalls and yuletide street entertainment). The group of volunteers also supports and raises funds for other events such "Uppingham Films" which screens movies in the Town Hall, and supports 'Uppingham in Bloom' which has become a multiple gold-medal winner with Britain in Bloom. It is not to be confused with Uppingham First, which is an unelected business partnership.

References

External links

Uppingham School
Uppingham Community College
Leighfield School
Uppingham Church of England Primary School
Uppingham Town Council
Uppingham Town Partnership
Christmas in Uppingham
Uppingham Films
Uppingham in Bloom
Love Uppingham
Uppingham Town Council

 
Market towns in Rutland
Towns in Rutland
Civil parishes in Rutland